Wilhelm Suhren (born 2 August 1927) is a German former field hockey player who competed in the 1952 Summer Olympics.

References

External links
 

1927 births
Possibly living people
German male field hockey players
Olympic field hockey players of Germany
Field hockey players at the 1952 Summer Olympics